In probability theory, the multidimensional Chebyshev's inequality is a generalization of Chebyshev's inequality, which puts a bound on the probability of the event that a random variable differs from its expected value by more than a specified amount.

Let  be an -dimensional random vector with expected value  and covariance matrix

 

If  is a positive-definite matrix, for any real number :

Proof
Define the random variable

Since  is positive, Markov's inequality holds:

Finally,

Infinite dimensions
There is a straightforward extension of the vector version of Chebyshev's inequality to infinite dimensional settings. Let  be a random variable which takes values in a Fréchet space  (equipped with seminorms ). This includes most common settings of vector-valued random variables, e.g., when  is a Banach space (equipped with a single norm), a Hilbert space, or the finite-dimensional setting as described above.

Suppose that  is of "strong order two", meaning that

 

for every seminorm . This is a generalization of the requirement that  have finite variance, and is necessary for this strong form of Chebyshev's inequality in infinite dimensions. The terminology "strong order two" is due to Vakhania.

be the standard deviation with respect to the seminorm . In this setting we can state the following:

General version of Chebyshev's inequality. 

Proof. The proof is straightforward, and essentially the same as the finitary version. If , then  is constant (and equal to ) almost surely, so the inequality is trivial.

If

The crucial trick in Chebyshev's inequality is to recognize that .

The following calculations complete the proof:

References

Probabilistic inequalities
Statistical inequalities